Roberto Serra (born 4 September 1982) is an Italian short track speed skater. He competed in the men's 500 metres event at the 2006 Winter Olympics.

References

External links
 
Roberto Serra at ISU

1982 births
Living people
Italian male short track speed skaters
Olympic short track speed skaters of Italy
Short track speed skaters at the 2006 Winter Olympics
People from Aosta
Sportspeople from Aosta Valley